The Rural Municipality of Hudson Bay No. 394 is a rural municipality (RM) in the Canadian province of Saskatchewan within Census Division No. 14 and  Division No. 4. At 12,462 square kilometres in area, it is the largest rural municipality in Saskatchewan. It is located in the northeast-central portion of the province.

History 
The RM of Hudson Bay No. 394 incorporated as a rural municipality on May 1, 1977.

Geography

Communities and localities 
The following urban municipalities are surrounded by the RM.

Towns
Hudson Bay

The following unincorporated communities are within the RM.

Organized hamlets
Elbow Lake
Erwood
Little Swan River

Localities
Akosane
Bertwell
Etomami
Hudson Bay Junction
Reserve
Veillardville

The RM also surrounds several First Nations communities.

Demographics 

It is the least densely populated rural municipality in Saskatchewan.

Government 
The RM of Hudson Bay No. 394 is governed by an elected municipal council and an appointed administrator that meets on the second Tuesday of every month. The reeve of the RM is Neal Hardy while its administrator is Tracy Smith. The RM's office is located in Hudson Bay.

Transportation 
Rail
Hudson Bay Branch C.N.R. - serves Hudson Bay Junction, Wachee, Ceba, Chemong)
Swan River - Prince Albert Branch C.N.R. - serves Baden, Powell, Barrows Junction, Westgate, Roscoe, Erwood, Hudson Bay Junction, Greenbush, Prairie River, Bannock, Mistatim, Peesane, Crooked River, Eldersley, Tisdale, Valparaiso

Roads
Highway 3—serves Hudson Bay and Erwood
Highway 9—serves Hudson Bay
Highway 55—Comes near Shoal Lake First Nation and Red Earth First Nation
Highway 980—serves Woody River Recreation Site
Highway 981—serves Erwood
Highway 982 (Little Swan Road)—connects Hudson Bay and Swan Plain, Saskatchewan
Highway 983 (McBride Lake Road)—serves Reserve

See also 
List of rural municipalities in Saskatchewan

References 

H